Poison – Rock Champions is a compilation album by American rock band Poison, released in 2001 by EMI.

The album consists of fourteen studio tracks from Poison's previous albums, Look What the Cat Dragged In, Open Up and Say...Ahh!, Flesh & Blood and also Native Tongue. It features no songs from Crack a Smile... and More! or Power to the People.

Overview
The compilation was a follow up/alternate version from the original Poison hits album Poison's Greatest Hits: 1986–1996 which was released in 1996. However, it still features the bands #1 hit single "Every Rose Has Its Thorn" and the top ten singles "Unskinny Bop" and "Your Mama Don't Dance".

Rock Champions has a stronger focus on the band's fourth album Native Tongue. It has a total of six tracks represented, including the single "Body Talk", compared to only one track represented on the original compilation.

The album was produced by Ric Browde, Tom Werman, Bruce Fairbairn and Richie Zito.

Track listing
 Unskinny Bop - (from Flesh & Blood)--3:48
 Your Mama Don't Dance - (from Open Up and Say...Ahh!)--3:00
 Look What the Cat Dragged In - (from Look What the Cat Dragged In)-3:11
 Play Dirty - (from Look What the Cat Dragged In)--4:06
 Body Talk - (from Native Tongue)--4:01
 Every Rose Has Its Thorn - (from Open Up and Say...Ahh!)--4:20
 Ain't That The Truth - (from Native Tongue)--3:25
 Bring It Home - (from Native Tongue)--3:55
 #1 Bad Boy - (from Look What the Cat Dragged In)--3:14
 Ride Child Ride - (from Native Tongue)--3:53
 Want Some, Need Some - (from Look What the Cat Dragged In)--3:38
 Let Me Go to the Show - (from Look What the Cat Dragged In)--2:45
 Bastard Son of a Thousand Blues - (from Native Tongue)--4:57
 Theatre of the Soul - (from Native Tongue) --4:41

Personnel
 Bret Michaels - lead vocals
 Bobby Dall - bass guitar
 Rikki Rockett - drums
 C.C. DeVille - lead guitar
 Richie Kotzen - lead guitar

References

Poison (American band) compilation albums
2000 compilation albums